Montmorency Park may refer to:
Montmorency Falls Park
Parc Montmorency